The Shark is Still Working is a feature-length documentary film on the impact and legacy of the 1975 Steven Spielberg blockbuster film Jaws. It features interviews with a range of cast and crew from the film. It is narrated by Roy Scheider and dedicated to Peter Benchley.

The documentary was produced by Jaws fans over a seven-year period, building on Laurent Bouzereau's 1995 documentary, The Making of Jaws, that has been included on some laserdisc and DVD releases. Throughout other documentaries over the years, such as Bouzereau's and the BBC's 1997 documentary In the Teeth of Jaws, actor Richard Dreyfuss has recounted tales about the troubled production of Jaws and the quote “The shark is NOT working” which Dreyfuss would hear constantly from members of the crew. Eventually, upon successful attempts to fix the malfunctioning sea monster, Dreyfuss would regularly hear the quote “The shark is working."

Universal Studios announced that The Shark Is Still Working documentary would be included as a special feature on the Blu-ray edition of Jaws.

Some of the interviews were filmed in 4:3 Academy ratio, typical of TV documentaries of the time. As the production went on, 16:9 became the TV shape standard and so the documentary crops the top and bottom of the image to reshape it to 16:9. There is no anamorphic enhancement of the documentary on the Jaws Blu-Ray.

Crew
The Shark Is Still Working was created by producers James Gelet, Jake Gove, Erik Hollander, and James-Michael Roddy, co-producer and composer Michael McCormack, and associate producer Roy Scheider.

Participants
The documentary features rare footage and exclusive interviews with most of the cast and crew of Jaws, as well as celebrities whose careers have been influenced by the film. It was written by James Gelet, directed by Erik Hollander and narrated by Academy Award nominee Roy Scheider, who played Chief Brody. Among the more notable of those interviewed are Steven Spielberg, Roy Scheider, Richard Dreyfuss, John Williams, Peter Benchley (in what would be his final on-camera interview), Carl Gottlieb, Joe Alves, Richard Zanuck, David Brown, Susan Backlinie, Jeffrey Kramer, Ron and Valerie Taylor, Dick Warlock, Kevin Smith, Robert Rodriguez, Bryan Singer, Greg Nicotero, Tom Savini, Eli Roth, M. Night Shyamalan, Percy Rodriguez (in what would be his final public appearance), and Paul McPhee.

Premiere
The Shark is Still Working made its world premiere May 2, 2009 at the Los Angeles United Film Festival.

Track listing for the 2012 soundtrack album
A limited edition 38 track companion CD soundtrack by composer Michael McCormack was released online and at Jawsfest, August 9, 2012.

 The Shark Is Still Working Theme
 On-Set Setbacks
 Lights, Camera, Hold On
 Robot Shark
 The Indianapolis Saga
 Yellow Barrels
 Martha's Song
 The Shark Is Not Working
 The Kid At the Table
 Aquaphobia
 Fans of the Fin
 Orcas
 Momentum
 Ticket to Terror
 A Time for Reflection
 Lurking Beneath
 The Year Was 1975!
 Festival
 You Always Make Me Smile
 Call Me Ishmael
 The Legacy
 Bloody Tourist
 Summer in Edgartown
 A Whaaat...?
 The Amity Suite
 The Human Effect
 Feeding Frenzy
 Jaws Forever
 Fate of the Sharks
 Cage Attack
 Great White
 Deep Blue
 Sandcastle
 Mother Cutter
 In Celebration of Our Heroes
 Surviving the Challenge
 Show Me the Way to Go Home
 Spanish Ladies

References

External links

Documentary website
 
 RottenTomatoes Reviews Page
Ain't it Cool review
JAWS Blu-ray press release
Official Soundtrack Website

American documentary films
Jaws (franchise)
Films about sharks
Documentary films about films
2012 documentary films
2012 films
2010s English-language films
2010s American films